The Mojave River League is a high school athletic league that is part of the CIF Southern Section. Members are located in the Hesperia and Apple Valley area of San Bernardino County, California, north of Cajon Pass in the San Gabriel Mountains.

Members
 Apple Valley High School
 Burroughs High School
 Hesperia High School
 Oak Hills High School 
 Serrano High School
 Sultana High School

References

CIF Southern Section leagues